Walter E. Smithe is a furniture company based in Itasca, Illinois. The company makes, sells, and repairs furniture, specializing in custom upholstery, and operates ten showrooms throughout the Chicago metropolitan area. It was founded by Walter Edward Smithe and Bill Shanahan in 1945. Currently, there are 3 generations involved in the business: Walter Smithe Jr is retired, but regularly visits the showrooms. Walter Smithe III and Mark Smithe (the Smithe Brothers) are the sons of Walter Jr, and serve as President and VP/Legal Counsel, respectively. The 3rd brother, Tim Smithe, retired in 2016. The Smithe brothers have been described as "Chicago's most recognizable furniture purveyors", due to their ubiquitous television commercials starring themselves. The 4th generation (the Smithe Sisters), all daughters of Walter III, are Maureen Smithe (buyer), Meghan Smithe (director of marketing), Caitie Smithe (designer, design coordinator and stylist) and Colleen Smithe (director of advertising).

History
The company began in 1945 as Tone Appliances and Furniture, a single store on Belmont Avenue in Chicago. Walter E. Smithe and Bill Shanahan founded the store anticipating a booming economy in the wake of World War II. The two renamed the store Smithe and Shanahan, but Bill Shanahan eventually sold his share to Smithe's brother Charlie.

Walter E. Smithe, Jr. joined the business in the 1960s with his brothers Gary and Tomm, and began phasing out appliances to focus on custom upholstery. In the 1970’s Walter left Smithe and Shanahan (His brothers remained with the original company) to start his own company - Walter E. Smithe. His sons, Walter, Tim, and Mark, joined the company in the 1970s and 1980s. Today, the company has ten showrooms in Illinois and Indiana and is listed by Furniture Today as one of the top one hundred furniture retailers in the United States.

Commercials 
The company has become well known in the Chicago area for its television commercials, which for decades starred the three Smithe brothers, and now star the four Smithe sisters. The slogans "You dream it, we build it", or "That's Smithe, with an E" are commonly used. The company's commercials were originally straightforward descriptions of their products and services, but in 2003, the brothers decided to include outtakes from past filmings, which showed the brothers stumbling over words and laughing at each other. The Smithes had been encouraged to air their outtakes on television after Tim Smithe screened them at an interior design seminar and received a positive reaction from the crowd. This began a long series of lighthearted television commercials, which became increasingly elaborate over the next few years.

Many of Walter E. Smithe's commercials have been pop culture parodies. One spot was modeled after Apple's weird  commercials. Others have been parodies of reality television shows, such as The Apprentice and The Bachelor. A 2005 advertisement showed Mark and Tim Smithe dueling with CGI-enhanced lamps in an homage to the lightsaber duels of the Star Wars films. In 2008, they filmed and edited a takeoff of the Sex and the City franchise, with the brothers sipping "Smithe-o-politans".

One of Walter E. Smithe's most discussed commercials aired in late March 2006. The spot showed the brothers at a news conference announcing that they had purchased Wrigley Field, home of the Chicago Cubs, with plans to rename it Walter E. Smithe Field. The commercial included the tagline "Change the Name, Change the Luck", a reference to the Cubs' decades-long struggle to reach the World Series. It also featured an appearance by Dutchie Caray, wife of the late Cubs announcer Harry Caray. The announcement was merely an early April Fools' Day prank, although the Smithe brothers said they had received about one hundred emails from viewers who were not sure what to think.

Chicagoans have had mixed reactions to the Walter E. Smithe commercials. Some have criticized the spots for underemphasizing Walter E. Smithe's actual furniture products.  However, Lewis Lazare, the Chicago Sun-Times' advertising critic, has defended the commercials. "In what seems to be their unending and over-the-top zeal to self-promote, they just may be helping drive traffic," he wrote, adding, "If nothing else, the advertising suggests the chain has some suits with personality attached." Maria Coons, a marketing teacher at Harper College, has also defended the advertisements, telling a Daily Herald reporter, "Some people who aren't in that [30 to 60 year old] demographic might consider them dorky, but for their target market, they're not. For people who are in their 40s and have families, that's how brothers act around each other when they get together. Plus, they seem like nice guys. Then they tie in pop culture ... it shows that they're sort of a with-it furniture company." Of the commercials, Tim Smithe has said, "We wanted to entertain people first, so then when we wanted to inform them they'd already be paying attention".

Family

In March, 2017, daughters of Walter E. Smithe III became the fourth generation of the Smithe family to be featured in the commercials.

Notes

External links
Company website

Furniture retailers of the United States
Retail companies established in 1945
Companies based in DuPage County, Illinois
Itasca, Illinois
Culture of Chicago
1945 establishments in Illinois